The Brooker Subdivision is a railroad line owned by CSX Transportation in  Florida. The line runs from the CSX S Line (the Wildwood Subdivision) at Wannee Junction in Starke to Newberry for a total of 39.6 miles. At its north end it continues south from the Wildwood Subdivision and at its south end it junctions at a wye with the Florida Northern Railroad (the former West Coast Subdivision).

History

The Brooker Subdivision from Starke to Hainesworth (just west of LaCrosse) was originally built from 1863 to 1894 by the Atlantic, Suwannee River and Gulf Railway, which would eventually run in its entirety from Starke east to Wannee (which is why the junction with the Wildwood Subdivision is still known as Wannee Junction).  The Atlantic, Suwannee River and Gulf Railway was leased by the Florida Central and Peninsular Railroad in 1899, which would in turn be bought by the Seaboard Air Line Railroad a year later.  The Seaboard would designate this line as the Wannee Subdivision.

From Hainesworth to Newberry, the line was originally part of the Jacksonville and Southwestern Railroad which was built in 1899.  The Jacksonville and Southwestern Railroad, which originated in Jacksonville and ran through Baldwin was bought by the Atlantic Coast Line Railroad in 1904.

The Atlantic Coast Line and Seaboard Air Line Railroads merged in 1967 which brought all of the trackage under a single owner, the Seaboard Coast Line Railroad, which would become CSX Transportation in the 1980s.  In the early 1970s, the Wannee Subdivision from Brooker to Hainesworth was abandoned along with much of the original Atlantic, Suwannee River and Gulf Railway.  Trains could still access Gainesville and Newberry via the former Jacksonville and Southwestern Railroad from Mattox.  When that line was abandoned north of Hainesworth, track from there to Brooker was rebuilt and was designated as the Brooker Subdivision.  The former Atlantic Coast Line segments mileposts were also renumbered to match the Seaboard segments (SN prefix), which is unusual for CSX lines.  The previous mileposts on this segment had an ASG prefix.

See also
 List of CSX Transportation lines

References

CSX Transportation lines
Rail infrastructure in Florida
Seaboard Air Line Railroad